The word Small Start Unit (also called small start-up, or SSU) emerged as a business term to address small entities that are going to launch an innovative and specific business model in the market place. This not only on a larger geographical scale, but also with a vantage in technology they offer. In combination that gives them a sustainable competitive advantage, which they play off against (major) market competitors right from the beginning. SSU's are mainly of Western origin.

The promising business model of a Small start unit is likely to attract venture capitalists . Such Venture Capitalists supply SSU's with needed capital for the get-go. With this capital SSU's are able to set up the headquarters in their home market, typically a well-developed market in a Western country. Despite the disadvantage of higher costs, their competitive advantage enables them to generate new jobs in the home market by employing high-end engineers, marketing professionals and well educated managers.

Basically the characteristic of an SSU is: 1. The core competency resides in a future technology; 2. The aim is to operate on a global scale right from the beginning; 3. There is a high growth orientation within the firm; 4. A flexible network is related to them, consisting of internal and external stakeholders; 5. It is able to fragment mass markets into niches; 6. Technology is built on open source technology; And 7. products are brought to markets rapidly.

By pursuing a global approach SSU's do not only exploit emerging and lucrative selling markets, but also lower their costs and boost profits more quickly by embedding their business partner in emerging markets (see George S. Yip) into their value chain. SSU's take advantages out of emerging markets as well as Western markets. So globalization allows SSU's to become long-lasting and successful business entities.

External links
 SSU's are ready for globalization 
 Success for Small start units 

Business models